Chesnut Lodge is a small suburb of Widnes within the borough of Halton, in Cheshire, England. It has a small range of local services including a chip shop, dental practice, newsagents, chemist's, cafe, pub, and hairdresser's. Seven bus services pass through each way every hour.

Transport 
There are seven bus services an hour which pass through Chesnut Lodge by Arriva North West, which operate to destinations such as Runcorn, Liverpool, Warrington, and a once a day service to Chester after 7:00pm. The nearest railway station is Hough Green railway station 0.5 miles away.

Widnes